Election of delegates to the 1934 Philippine Constitutional Convention was held on July 10, 1934, in accordance with the Tydings-McDuffie Act.

The Convention drafted the 1935 Constitution, which was the basic law of the Philippines under the American-sponsored Commonwealth of the Philippines and the post-War, sovereign Third Republic.

Results

See also
Commission on Elections
Politics of the Philippines
Philippine elections
Philippine Constitution

References

External links
 Official website of the Commission on Elections
 Full text of the 1935 Philippine Constitution
 Journals of the Constitutional Convention of 1934

1934 constitutional convention
1934 elections in Asia
Constitutional Convention election